Tony Lesueur (born 19 August 2000) is a French professional footballer who plays as a midfielder for Regionalliga club Schwarz-Weiß Rehden.

Club career 
Lesueur joined the academy of Chambly at the age of six, and moved to the academy of Sochaux nine years later. He returned to Chambly in 2020. Lesueur made his professional debut with Chambly in a 1–0 Ligue 2 loss to Clermont on 13 February 2021.

References

External links

2000 births
Living people
Sportspeople from Épinay-sur-Seine
Footballers from Seine-Saint-Denis
French footballers
French people of Guadeloupean descent
Black French sportspeople
Association football midfielders
FC Sochaux-Montbéliard players
FC Chambly Oise players
BSV Schwarz-Weiß Rehden players
Championnat National 3 players
Ligue 2 players
Championnat National players
Regionalliga players
French expatriate footballers
Expatriate footballers in Germany
French expatriate sportspeople in Germany